John Francis Crosby (October 26, 1889 – December 10, 1962) was an American attorney who served as the United States Attorney for the District of Connecticut under two presidents. He also served as the Assistant U.S. Attorney General.

Biography 
Born in Wisconsin, John would move up and down the east coast during his lifetime. He worked as an attorney serving as the US Attorney for Connecticut and the assistant US Attorney General. After attending Georgetown Preparatory School, he was the Valedictorian from Georgetown University in 1912 and went to Harvard Law School after that.

He died on December 10, 1962, at his home in Spring Lake, New Jersey.

References

1889 births
1962 deaths
20th-century American lawyers
Connecticut lawyers
Harvard Law School alumni
United States Attorneys for the District of Connecticut
Georgetown Preparatory School alumni
Georgetown University alumni
People from Fond du Lac, Wisconsin
People from Spring Lake, New Jersey